is a 1983 Japanese historical martial arts fantasy film directed by Kinji Fukasaku. The script is adapted from Toshio Kamata's 1982 novel Shin Satomi Hakkenden (新・里見八犬伝), itself a loose reworking of the epic serial Nansō Satomi Hakkenden by Kyokutei Bakin.

Synopsis
The story follows Princess Shizu (Hiroko Yakushimaru), her family slain and on the run from her enemies. As she escapes she is found by the vagabond Shinbei (Hiroyuki Sanada), before being rescued from her pursuers by Dōsetsu (Sonny Chiba). He tells her the legend of a curse on her family, and of eight beads that identify eight dog-warriors who can lift it, of which he and his companion are two. To defeat the evil queen Tamazusa (Mari Natsuki) who killed her family, they must find all eight. But Shinbei hears of Princess Shizu's identity, and vows to collect the reward for capturing her.

Cast 
Hiroko Yakushimaru as Princess Shizu
Hiroyuki Sanada as Inue Shinbee Masashi
Sonny Chiba as Inuyama Dōsetsu Tadatomo
Minori Terada as Inumura Daikaku Masanori
Masaki Kyomoto as Inuzuka Shino Moritaka
Etsuko Shihomi as Inusaka Keno Tanetomo
Takuya Fukuhara as Inukawa Sōsuke Yoshitō
Shunsuke Kariya as Inuta Kobungo Yasuyori
Kenji Ohba as Inukai Genpachi Nobufuchi
Keiko Matsuzaka as Princess Fuse
Mari Natsuki as Tamazusa
Yūki Meguro as Hikita Gonnokami Motofuji
Nagare Hagiwara as Yōnosuke
Mamako Yoneyama as Funamushi
Akira Shioji as Genjin
Tatsuo Endō as Mayuroku
Nana Okada as Hamaji
Akira Hamada as Akushirō

Production

Adaptation
The film preserves little of the plot or characterization, and none of the feel of the Bakin original. Instead it builds on the basic template – collecting a band of warriors together to accomplish a task, better known from films such as Kurosawa's Seven Samurai. While some of the back story and key elements like the beads remain, even the eight dog brothers are substantially changed, to the extent of Keno's feminine disguise becoming actual womanhood.

Effects
Fantastical elements in the film are brought to life with a combination of props, wire work, and post-production special effects. While the best of these like the eight glowing beads work well, others such as the rubber giant flying snake have aged less gracefully. The film version maintains the ero-guro elements of Kamata's book, including a nude blood-bathing rejuvenation scene.

Score
The colorful film score features a mixture of synthesizers and "real" strings produced by Nobody, and a couple of power ballads performed by John O'Banion: Satomi Hakkenden, composed by Joey Carbone and written by Kathi Pinto, and Hakkenshi no Tēma (White Light) (八剣士のテーマ), composed by Joey Carbone and Richie Zito, written by David Palmer. An LP of the music was released by Eastworld.

Reception
Legend of the Eight Samurai was the number one Japanese film on the domestic market in 1984, earning ¥2.3 billion in distribution income.

Versions
Various English releases have been sold since the 1980s under the title Legend of the Eight Samurai, or Legend of Eight Samurai. An English dubbed version was released with some script modifications; and in 2005 an uncut, English subtitled version of the film was released. In 2012 the film was released on Blu-ray in Japan as part of the "Kadokawa Blu-ray Collection". On May 5, 2005, Digiview Entertainment released the English dub version of the film on DVD. It was on sale for $1, in many places like Wal-Mart, Dollar Store, etc.

References

External links
 
  Legend of the Eight Samurai at the Japanese Movie Database

Reviews
 thegline.com
 Review Hong Kong Digital
 

1983 films
Films based on Japanese novels
Films directed by Kinji Fukasaku
1980s Japanese-language films
Samurai films
Toei Company films
1980s Japanese films